Ateucheta is a monotypic moth genus in the subfamily Arctiinae erected by Alfred Jefferis Turner in 1940. Its single species, Ateucheta zatesima, was first described by George Hampson in 1914. It is found in Australia.

References

Lithosiini
Monotypic moth genera
Moths of Australia